A transfusion transmitted infection (TTI) is a virus, parasite, or other potential pathogen that can be transmitted in donated blood through a transfusion to a recipient.  The term is usually limited to known pathogens, but also sometimes includes agents such as Simian foamy virus which are not known to cause disease.

Preventing the spread of these diseases by blood transfusion is addressed in several ways.  In many cases, the blood is tested for the pathogen, sometimes with several different methodologies.  Donors of blood are also screened for signs and symptoms of disease and for activities that might put them at risk for infection.  If a local supply is not safe, blood may be imported from other areas.  Human immunodeficiency virus (HIV) leads to the best known of the transfusion transmitted diseases, acquired immune deficiency syndrome (AIDS).

Blood that is processed into medications by fractionation is treated in a multi-step process called pathogen inactivation that is analogous to pasteurization: it destroys most viruses and bacteria in the blood.  Donors are still screened and tested.

Viruses 
Many of these viruses are controlled through laboratory screening tests.  These fall into three basic varieties: antibody tests, nucleic acid tests (NAT), and surrogate tests.  Antibody tests look for the immune system's response to the infection.  Nucleic acid tests look for the genetic material of the virus itself.  The third variety are tests that are not specific to the disease but look for other related conditions.

High risk activities for transfusion transmitted infections vary, and the amount of caution used for screening donors varies based on how dangerous the disease is.  Most of the viral diseases are spread by either sexual contact or by contact with blood, usually either drug use, accidental needle injuries among health care workers, unsterilized tattoo and body piercing equipment, or through a blood transfusion or transplant.  Other vectors exist.

Whether a donor is considered to be at "too high" of a risk for a disease to be allowed to donate is sometimes controversial, especially for sexual contact.  High risk sexual activity usually includes:
 Sex in exchange for money or drugs.
 Men who have sex with men, the most controversial criterion.
 A recent history of sexually transmitted disease.
 Sex with a person who has had a positive test or was at high risk for a disease that can be spread in blood transfusions.

HIV

The virus that causes AIDS is the best known of the transfusion-transmitted infections because of high-profile cases such as Ryan White, a haemophiliac who was infected through factor VIII, a blood-derived medicine used to treat the disease. Another person who died of medically acquired HIV/AIDS was Damon Courtenay, who died in 1991 due to a bad batch of factor VIII.

The standard test for HIV is an enzyme immunoassay test that reacts with antibodies to the virus.  This test has a window period where a person will be infected but not yet have an immune response.  Other tests are used to look for donors during this period, specifically the p24 antigen test and nucleic acid testing.

In addition to the general risk criteria for viruses, blood donors are sometimes excluded if they have lived in certain parts of Africa where subtypes of HIV that are not reliably detected on some tests are found, specifically HIV group O.  People who have been in prison for extended periods are also excluded for HIV risk.

Hepatitis A
 Not a major concern, viremic donors are often obviously ill, not a chronic disease.
 Recipients of blood-derived clotting factor concentrates have become ill with Hepatitis A, but there are no documented cases of the disease being transmitted in transfused blood.

Hepatitis B
 The first virus routinely screened in blood donations.
 Delta agent not screened for, since it is a superinfection of Hepatitis B and cannot exist alone.

Hepatitis C
 Often silent infection
 Most likely significant TTI in developed countries

Alanine transaminase (ALT)
 Used as a surrogate for other Hepatitis testing, losing favor now that HCV tests have improved

Human T-Lymphotropic Virus (HTLV I/II)
 "HTLV III"

Cytomegalovirus (CMV)
 Not relevant unless recipient's immune system is compromised (i.e. infants).

West Nile virus
 is Japanese encephalitis a possible TTI?
 Pool vs. individual testing.

Simian foamy virus (SFV)
 Not known to cause disease, recent studies

SARS
 Donors screened
 No demonstrated transmission, hypothetical risk
 No resurgence of disease

Parasites and specific bacteria

Malaria (Plasmodia spp.)
 Tests exist, but they're not very good.
 Endemic in many areas of the world.
 Only relevant for red blood cell transfusions.

Babesiosis
Babesia microti is transmitted by ixodes ticks and causes babesiosis. Transfusion-associated babesiosis has been documented.

Chagas disease
 New test in use

Leishmaniasis
 Donors screened, problem for donors who have been to Iraq.

Syphilis
 Does not survive at refrigerated temperatures
 Used as test for high-risk sexual behavior

Lyme disease
 No cases have been reported, but the CDC urges caution due to a theoretical risk.

Other bacteria

Skin flora

Bacteremia and platelets
 Testing
 Part of the reason that platelet shelf life is so short

Variant Creutzfeldt–Jakob disease (vCJD)
 "Mad Cow"
 UK imported plasma for transfusion

See also
 Osborn v. Irwin Memorial Blood Bank

References

External links
  AABB list of TTIs.

Transfusion medicine